The Goodbye Kiss (also known as Goodbye My Love, Goodbye) is a 2006 Italian neo-noir film directed by Michele Soavi. It is based on the pulp novel Arrivederci amore, ciao by Massimo Carlotto. The film won the David di Donatello for best original song ("Insieme a te non ci sto più", performed by Caterina Caselli and written by Paolo Conte and others).

Cast 
Alessio Boni as Giorgio Pellegrini
Michele Placido as  Ferruccio Anedda
Isabella Ferrari as Flora
Alina Nedelea as Roberta
Carlo Cecchi as Sante Brianese
Antonello Fassari as Sergio Cosimato
Max Mazzotta as Ciccio Formaggio

References

External links

 

2006 films
Italian drama films
2006 drama films
Films directed by Michele Soavi
Italian neo-noir films
2000s Italian films